Justicia leucoxiphos is a species of plant in the family Acanthaceae. It is endemic to Cameroon.  Its natural habitat is subtropical or tropical moist lowland forests. It is threatened by habitat loss.

References

Flora of Cameroon
leucoxiphos
Endangered plants
Taxonomy articles created by Polbot